Davey Moore may refer to:

 Davey Moore (boxer, born 1933) (1933–1963), American featherweight boxer, fatally injured in a bout
 Davey Moore (boxer, born 1959) (1959–1988), American middleweight boxer, accidentally crushed by his own car
 Davey Moore (fl. 2000s), British writer associated with New Series Adventures

See also 
 David Moore (disambiguation)
 Dave Moore (disambiguation)